Charlotte is a city in the U.S. state of Michigan. As of the 2010 census, the city population was 9,074. It is the county seat of Eaton County.

Charlotte is in the central portion of the county, on the boundary between Eaton Township and Carmel Township, though politically independent of both. Interstate 69 serves the city, and connects it to the state capital of Lansing. It is located 21.5 miles (34.6 kilometers) from downtown Lansing.

History
In 1832, George Barnes purchased the land that would become Charlotte from the U.S. Government. Barnes in turn sold the land to Edmond B. Bostwick, a land speculator from New York City three years later in 1835. Bostwick then sold portions of the land to H.I. Lawrence, Townsend Harris, and Francis Cochran. These four created the village which they named after Edmond Bostwick's wife Charlotte. Jonathan Searles became the first postmaster on March 17, 1838.

Charlotte was incorporated as a village on October 10, 1863, and as a city on March 29, 1871. At various times, Charlotte had the unofficial names of Eaton Centre, and Carmel. It was designated as the county seat when Eaton County was organized in 1837; however, due to a lack of population and buildings, county functions were conducted at Bellevue until 1840.

The Dolson automobile was manufactured in Charlotte from 1904 to 1907.

Geography

Charlotte is situated on gently rolling prairie. The Battle Creek River has its northern bend in the south part of the city, entering from the southeast and exiting to the southwest. The northern part of the city is part of the Thornapple River watershed.

Demographics

2010 census
As of the census of 2010, there were 9,074 people, 3,661 households, and 2,291 families residing in the city. The racial makeup of the city was 95.1% White.

There were 3,661 households, of which 34.1% had children under the age of 18 living with them, 41.8% were married couples living together, 15.4% had a female householder with no husband present, 5.3% had a male householder with no wife present, and 37.4% were non-families. 32.0% of all households were made up of individuals, and 12.2% had someone living alone who was 65 years of age or older. The average household size was 2.38 and the average family size was 2.97.

The median age in the city was 35.8 years. 26% of residents were under the age of 18; 8.8% were between the ages of 18 and 24; 27.5% were from 25 to 44; 23.6% were from 45 to 64; and 14% were 65 years of age or older. The gender makeup of the city was 48.3% male and 51.7% female.

2000 census
As of the census of 2000, there were 8,389 people, 3,249 households, and 2,124 families residing in the city. The racial makeup of the city was 95.79% White, 0.94% African American, 0.55% Native American, 0.35% Asian, 1.07% from other races, and 1.30% from two or more races. Hispanic or Latino of any race were 3.46% of the population.

There were 3,249 households, out of which 34.1% had children under the age of 18 living with them, 46.7% were married couples living together, 13.9% had a female householder with no husband present, and 34.6% were non-families. 29.5% of all households were made up of individuals, and 12.1% had someone living alone who was 65 years of age or older. The average household size was 2.45 and the average family size was 3.02.

In the city, the population was spread out, with 26.5% under the age of 18, 10.1% from 18 to 24, 30.5% from 25 to 44, 19.4% from 45 to 64, and 13.6% who were 65 years of age or older. The median age was 34 years. For every 100 females, there were 95.7 males. For every 100 females age 18 and over, there were 91.9 males.

The median income for a household in the city was $37,473, and the median income for a family was $45,759. Males had a median income of $31,573 versus $27,019 for females. The per capita income for the city was $18,066. About 7.8% of families and 10.0% of the population were below the poverty line, including 11.3% of those under age 18 and 11.2% of those age 65 or over.

Education
Charlotte Public Schools operates Galewood Early Elementary for developmental kindergarten and kindergarten students, operates Parkview Elementary School and Washington Elementary School for first through third grade, and operates Charlotte Upper Elementary for fourth grade and fifth grade students. Charlotte Middle School serves seventh and eighth grade students while Charlotte High School serves ninth through twelfth grade students. The district also operates the Weymouth Child Development Center as a childcare facility.

There are two parochial schools in the city. Charlotte Adventist Christian School serves grades 1 through 8 and is owned and operated by the Charlotte Seventh-day Adventist Church and is a part of the Seventh-day Adventist education system. St. Mary Elementary School is run by Saint Mary Catholic Church and serves K-8 students and Preschool.

There is one alternative education school known as the Relevant Academy of Eaton County. In addition, special needs children are served by the Eaton Intermediate School District.

Further education/training can also be obtained at the Southridge Vocational Center.

Transportation

Highways

Air 
 In the northeast corner of the city is the Fitch H. Beach Airport.
 Scheduled passenger carrier flights are available at Capital Region International Airport, near the northeast corner of Eaton County.

Rail
 Charlotte was once serviced by the Grand Trunk Western Railroad and the Michigan Central Railroad. The original Michigan Central Railroad depot still stands at 430 N. Cochran Ave. and at various times has operated as a restaurant, ice cream parlor, and coffee shop.
 Currently Canadian National Railway and the Charlotte Southern Railroad provide rail service to the city.

Entertainment
A popular attraction is the Murder Mystery Dinner Train operated by the Old Road Railroad. While enjoying a leisurely trip through the countryside, a five course meal is served as theatrical entertainers perform a comical, and interactive murder mystery.
The Eaton Theatre, located downtown, also shows movies nightly and features an arcade as well as virtual reality gaming. The Eaton Theatre opened as a single screen in 1930 and is located downtown. Built during the Art Deco era it was totally modernized when it was twinned. It still has the large square marquee and the vertical sign, however the balcony area was transformed into a separate upstairs room to house a second screen. The theater is now owned and operated by Leann Owen. The Charlotte Performing Arts Center is home to music, vocal, and theatre performances by Charlotte Public Schools students. It is also home to performances by other groups based in and out of Charlotte.

City Parks

The city of Charlotte has many wonderful parks. City Parks are open May 1 thru October 31. These include:
Bennett Park (1225 S. Cochran), Dean Park (526 W. Stoddard), Gateway Park (N. Cochran and Packard), Lincoln Park (Lincoln St. and W. Shepherd), Oak Park (230 St. Clinton/Seminary St.), Snell Park (Upland and E. Shepherd), Southridge Park (312 W. Third), and U.S. Veterans Memorial Park (1501 S. Cochran).

Lincoln Park contains a Skate Park and Disc Golf Course. By the water tower nearby (at 619 W. Shepherd) there is a sled hill and ice skating rink, as well as a small outdoor dirt track for RC racing (aka Lincoln Park Raceway; added late 2013).

Tennis Courts and Gobel Football field are located at 1149 S. Cochran.

A popular sled hill known locally as Kane's Hill (named after the Kane family who lived nearby and operated Kane's Heating Services) is located on Gale St. between Church St. and E. Lovett St.

Economy 
Spartan Motors, an automobile design company that designs, engineers and manufactures specialty chassis, specialty vehicles, truck bodies and aftermarket parts for the recreational vehicle (RV), emergency response, government services, defense, and delivery and service markets, is based in Charlotte.

Pray Funeral Home, was established in 1923 by Ernest G. and Myron E. Praywas and was located in Charlotte's downtown business district until 1930. They were inducted into the NFDA's Hall of Excellence at the 125th annual convention in Philadelphia, PA. The Hall of Excellence, part of the NFDA's Pursuit of Excellence Program, honors firms for their continued outstanding service to families, commitment to the community and dedication to upholding the highest ethical and professional standards. Most of the families they serve are from Charlotte and the surrounding communities of Potterville, Vermontville, Olivet, Bellevue, and Dimondale.

Notable people
Emerson R. Boyles, chief justice of the Michigan Supreme Court (1940–1956)
A. Whitney Brown, comedian and writer known for Saturday Night Live
Paul H. Bruske, journalist, advertising executive, and sportsman
Luren Dickinson, 37th governor of Michigan
Francis C. Flaherty, WWII Medal of Honor recipient
Brock Gutierrez, National Football League player
Frank A. Hooker, justice of the Michigan Supreme Court
Eric Menk, professional basketball player in Denmark and the Philippines
Rocco Moore, National Football League player
Harry T. Morey, stage and film actor
Cooper Rush, National Football League quarterback with the Dallas Cowboys
Richard Taylor, metaphysical philosopher and author
Wayne Terwilliger, Major League Baseball player and coach

Climate
This climatic region is typified by large seasonal temperature differences, with warm to hot (and often humid) summers and cold (sometimes severely cold) winters. According to the Köppen Climate Classification system, Charlotte has a humid continental climate, abbreviated "Dfb" on climate maps.

References

External links
City of Charlotte

Cities in Eaton County, Michigan
County seats in Michigan
Lansing–East Lansing metropolitan area
Populated places established in 1863
1863 establishments in Michigan